Anne Wiazemsky (14 May 1947 – 5 October 2017) was a French actress and novelist. She made her cinema debut at the age of 18, playing Marie, the lead character in Robert Bresson's Au Hasard Balthazar (1966), and went on to appear in several of Jean-Luc Godard's films, among them La Chinoise (1967), Week End (1967), and One Plus One (1968).

Through her mother, she was the granddaughter of novelist and dramatist François Mauriac.

Early life
Wiazemsky was born on 14 May 1947 in Berlin, Germany. Her father Yvan Wiazemsky, a French diplomat, was a Russian prince who had emigrated to France following the Russian Revolution. Her mother Claire Mauriac was the daughter of François Mauriac, a winner of the Nobel Prize in Literature.

Wiazemsky spent her early years abroad following her father's postings around the world, including Geneva and Caracas before returning to Paris in 1962. She graduated from the high school Ecole Sainte Marie de Passy in Paris.

Career

Acting 
Wiazemsky made her on screen acting debut at the age of 18, playing Marie, the lead character in Robert Bresson's Au Hasard Balthazar (1966) after being introduced to the director by actress Florence Delay. The film premièred at the 1966 Venice Film Festival where it won the OCIC (International Catholic Organization for Cinema) Award, the San Giorgio Prize, and the New Cinema Award. It has since been listed by critics as one of the greatest films of all time. Filmmaker and Cahiers du Cinéma critic Jean-Luc Godard wrote a glowing review for the film, writing that "everyone who sees this film will be absolutely astonished [...] because this film is really the world in an hour and a half."

Wiazemsky subsequently developed a relationship with Godard, and married him one year later, in 1967. She starred in several of his films, including La Chinoise (1967), Week End (1967), and One Plus One (1968).

In the 1980s, she began to turn to work behind the camera. In 1994, she co-wrote the script Go Home, which starred Claire Denis in 1960s France. She began to direct television documentaries.

Writing 
In addition to acting, Wiazemsky wrote several novels, including Canines (1993), Une Poignée de Gens (1998), and Aux Quatre Coins du Monde (2001). Hymnes à l'Amour was filmed in 2003 as Toutes ces belles promesses (All the Fine Promises), directed by Jean-Paul Civeyrac and starring Valérie Crunchant and Bulle Ogier. Her novel Jeune Fille (2007) was based on her experience of starring in Au Hasard Balthazar.

In 2015, she wrote the novel Un An Après (“One Year After”), which chronicled her time shooting Godard's film La Chinoise to when their relationship soured. It was developed into a feature film, Le Redoubtable, by The Artist director Michel Hazanavicius and Wiazemsky was played by Stacy Martin.

Personal life
During the 1966 filming of Au Hasard Balthazar, director Robert Bresson proposed to her several times, though she refused. In 1967, she married Jean-Luc Godard, and subsequently starred in several of his films; the marriage officially ended in divorce in 1979, though the couple had separated as early as 1970.

In 1971, Wiazemsky signed the Manifesto of the 343, which publicly declared she had an abortion as a way to advocate for reproductive rights, even though the procedure was illegal in France at the time.

Death
Wiazemsky died of breast cancer on 5 October 2017, aged 70.

Filmography

Actress (partial listing)

Bibliography
Novels
 1989: Mon beau navire, Gallimard, Paris
 1991: Marimé, Gallimard, Paris
 1993: Canines, Gallimard, Paris
 1998: Une poignée de gens (1998 Grand Prix du roman de l'Académie française), Gallimard, Paris, 
 2001: Aux quatre coins du monde, Gallimard, Paris
 2002: Sept garçons, Gallimard, Paris
 2004: Je m'appelle Elizabeth (Je m'appelle Élisabeth), Gallimard, Paris
 2007: Jeune Fille, Gallimard, Paris, 
 2009: Mon enfant de Berlin, Gallimard, Paris
 2012: Une année studieuse, Gallimard, Paris 
 2015: Un an après, Gallimard, Paris, 

Short stories
 1988: Des filles bien élevées, Gallimard, Paris

Juvenile
 2003: Les Visiteurs du soir (illustrations by Stanislas Bouvier)

Memoirs
 1996: Hymnes à l'amour (1996 Prix Maurice Genevoix), Gallimard, Paris
 2017: Un saint homme, Gallimard, Paris, 

Biography
 1992: Album de famille
 2000: Il était une fois... les cafés (photographs by Roger-Viollet)
 2000: Tableaux de chats
 2001: Venise (photographs by Jean Noël de Soye)

Preface
 1994: En habillant

References

External links

 

1947 births
2017 deaths
Burials at Montparnasse Cemetery
French film actresses
French women novelists
French film directors
French women screenwriters
French screenwriters
French people of Russian descent
Prix Maurice Genevoix winners
Prix Jean Freustié winners
Prix Goncourt des lycéens winners
Grand Prix du roman de l'Académie française winners
Actresses from Berlin
Writers from Berlin
20th-century French actresses
20th-century French novelists
21st-century French novelists
Film directors from Berlin
20th-century French women writers
21st-century French women writers
Deaths from cancer in France
Prix Renaudot des lycéens winners
Signatories of the 1971 Manifesto of the 343